James Harrel "Speedy" Speer (March 5, 1895 – September 2, 1976) was a college football player for the Furman Paladins of Furman University and a high school football coach. He was elected to the South Carolina Athletics Hall of Fame in 1974, and the Furman Athletics Hall of Fame in 1981.

Furman
Citizens of Greenville raised the money for his college tuition, making him the first player ever recruited to Furman University. Speer also played basketball, baseball, and track.  He was captain of the football team for two years, the basketball team two years, and the baseball team one year. Contemporary opinion held Speer as the greatest athlete in school history.

Football
Speer was a running back, playing quarterback and halfback on Billy Laval's Furman Purple Hurricane.

1919
Speer was selected All-Southern quarterback by Atlanta Journal sporting editor Morgan Blake in 1919.

1920
Before the season, he and coach Laval spent time at the University of Illinois learning strategy. From the halfback position, he helped lead the 1920 team to a 9–1 record, outscoring opponents 286–16 and losing only to SIAA champion Georgia. Teammates included quarterback Milton McManaway and lineman Manning Jeter.

Baseball 
Speer batted .400 in each of his three seasons on the baseball team.

High school football
Speer coached at Greenville High School for 21 years, taking his team all the way to the state final in 1938 and 1944.  In 1942 his South Carolina team won the Shrine Bowl of the Carolinas.

References

External links
 

1895 births
1976 deaths
American football halfbacks
American football quarterbacks
American men's basketball players
Furman Paladins baseball players
Furman Paladins men's basketball players
Furman Paladins football players
College men's track and field athletes in the United States
High school football coaches in South Carolina
All-Southern college football players
Sportspeople from Greenville, South Carolina
Players of American football from South Carolina
Players of American football from Winston-Salem, North Carolina
Basketball players from Winston-Salem, North Carolina
Baseball players from Winston-Salem, North Carolina